HNLMS Tromp (F801) was a frigate of the . The ship was in service with the Royal Netherlands Navy from 1975 to 1999. The frigate was named after Dutch naval hero Tromp. The ship's radio call sign was "PADE".

Service history
HNLMS Tromp was one of two s and was built at the KM de Schelde in Vlissingen. The keel laying took place on 4 August 1971 and the launching on 3 June 1973. The ship was put into service on 3 October 1975.

On 12 March 1979 she and the frigate , the destroyer  and the replenishment ship Poolster departed for a trip to the Far East to show the flag.

The ship was part off NATO STANAVFORLANT '86 for which it was sent to North America. During the trip a fire broke out in the engine room. In 1986 the future King of the Netherlands Willem-Alexander would also serve aboard the ship.

The ships returned to Den Helder on 19 May 1982.

In 1999 the vessel was decommissioned and later scrapped.

Notes

Tromp-class frigates
1973 ships
Ships built in Vlissingen
Frigates of the Cold War